Eefke Mulder (born 13 October 1977 in Nijmegen, Gelderland) is a Dutch field hockey player, who played as a midfielder for Dutch club NMHC Nijmegen. She made her debut for the Netherlands national team on 2 June 1997 at the Champions Trophy in Berlin.

Mulder was a member of the Dutch squad that won the silver medal at the 2004 Summer Olympics in Athens. She was also part of the Dutch squad that became World Champions at the 2006 Women's Hockey World Cup in Madrid.

At the 2008 Summer Olympics in Beijing she won an Olympic gold medal with the Dutch national team beating China in the final 2–0.

References
  Dutch Olympic Committee

External links
 

1977 births
Living people
Dutch female field hockey players
Olympic field hockey players of the Netherlands
Olympic gold medalists for the Netherlands
Olympic silver medalists for the Netherlands
Olympic medalists in field hockey
Field hockey players at the 2004 Summer Olympics
Field hockey players at the 2008 Summer Olympics
Medalists at the 2004 Summer Olympics
Medalists at the 2008 Summer Olympics
Sportspeople from Nijmegen
NMHC Nijmegen players
20th-century Dutch women
21st-century Dutch women